is the main character of the manga Rave Master by Hiro Mashima. Born on Garage Island, Haru was left in the care of his older sister. In the beginning, Haru accidentally fishes Plue up, and his owner, Shiba meets him with terrorists from the Demon Card organization. Shiba tells Haru that he is the Second Rave Master, entrusting the sword , Plue, and his  to him. Seeking power to defeat Demon Card, Haru and Plue set off on a journey to find the missing Rave stones.

Haru was created by Mashima before the series' beginning as he always wanted to use him. His relationship with his family was explored earlier than planned in order to improve the series' popularity. The character is voiced by Tomokazu Seki and Yuri Lowenthal in Japanese and English, respectively.

Critical response to Haru was often mixed with several critics finding him as a conventional hero often seen in series from the same genre. His portrayal in the anime adaptation was met with negative responses too for how the localization changed Haru's characterization.

Creation
The Rave Master protagonist, Haru Glory, was designed prior to developing the manga; author Hiro Mashima always wanted to draw him before the series' conception. His sidekick, Plue, was also designed much earlier when he was in high school. In early drafts of the series, Haru was an alchemist able to control metal but this idea was scrapped as the author found his attacks maniacal. This led to the new concept of Haru being a swordsman. Mashima still felt this weapon was too boring and came up with the idea of the larger  Ten Commandment Swords so that Haru could perform several types of attacks with the same weapon. The protagonist's personality was caring, typical of a young man he wanted to draw. Despite being nice, he was also open to the idea of violence. 

Haru is the successor of the supporting Shiba who was planned to die in the first story arc. However, this idea was also discarded as the author found it would negatively affect Haru and Plue's journey. Mashima wanted his readers to have familiar names for his protagonists. As a result, Haru's given name literally means "spring" to emphasize his warm personality. During the making of the series, manga author Mashima considered Haru as the "angsty hard-working type". As a result, when writing his next work, Fairy Tail, Mashima made the new lead Natsu Dragneel to be calmer than Haru.

Early during publication, Rave Master almost faced cancellation due to sub-par reader surveys. As a result, Mashima was forced to move the story to the parts he found more interesting involving Haru's father, Gale, and his rival, King. As a result, King is killed earlier than scheduled leading his son to be Haru's true final enemy, Lucia. This was made possible thanks the series' newfound popularity. The second fight between Haru and Lucia serves as a halfway point of the Rave Master manga. From this point, the plot would focus on the mystery of the series, most notably how Shiba knows of Haru or what is the connection between the protagonist and the Lucia. During the finale, Mashima enjoyed the scene where Haru encourages Shuda to fight together in order to surpass Gale which led to toning down the previous fight. Mashima has mixed feeling about the final fight between Haru and Lucia as he wonders if he should have given it more chapters. The idea of Haru surviving to the aftermath surprised several readers according to the author though Mashima still suggests it was overshadowed by Elie's older appearance. 

In Japanese, Haru is voiced by Tomokazu Seki. His replacement for the English adaptation is Yuri Lowenthal. Lowenthal said that Haru was one of his first leading roles but expressed disappointment with how he was unable to finish the story.

Appearances

Rave Master
In the series' beginning, Haru fishes a creature known as Plue out of the ocean and meets the previous Rave Master Shiba, who realizes the youth to be his successor. After realizing the threat that the Demon Card organization pose to the world, Haru promises Shiba that he will find the Rave Stone and stop the Demon Card's evil with Plue by his side. Along the way, he is joined by allies, each having their own goals, yet they were bound together thanks to him and helping each other along the way. He is very protective of Elie, and does anything he can to ensure her safety. As the Rave Master, Haru carries a special sword called the Ten Commandments or TCM, (or the Ten Powers in the English dub) that can change from its Eisenmeteor form to nine other forms once the Rave Stones are embedded into it. He also encounters Gale "King" Raregroove, the king of the Raregroove Kingdom and leader of Demon Card. On the Tower of Din, Haru reunites with his absent father Gale Glory to defeat King and end Demon Card. Although they win, Gale sacrifices himself to save his son from Din's destruction.

Some time later, King's son, Lucia, appears and revives Demon Card. He wishes to capture Elie to use the magical energy known as Etherion hidden within her body. While facing Lucia and his forces, Haru's group also learn of the mythical creature known as Endless, which threatens mankind by provoking another Overdrive and can only be destroyed with Etherion. In order to prepare to become the full fledged Second Rave Master, Haru has a ceremonial fight with a young Shiba. As Shiba fought for the sake of Resha, Haru decides his reason to fight is to protect Elie which gives the strength to win the duel and become the heir of Rave. After Haru finds all of the Raves, Elie uses Etherion to combine them. In order to avoid another Overdrive, Haru and his friends oppose Lucia and his strongest enemies in the Star Memory. Although Haru defeats Lucia, he is absorbed by Endless and convinces Elie to destroy it even if it means taking his life. One year later, Elie has lost her memories of Haru, and she and the others visit his grave. Haru appears alive thanks to the Star Memory's magic and reunites with Elie, who then remembers him. Haru and Elie return to Garage Island to live together with a final scene of the manga revealing they have a child named Levin who inherited Elie's amnesia.

Other appearances
Haru appears in a manga omake crossover chapter of Fairy Tail titled "Fairy Tail × Rave Master", first published in Issue #5 of Magazine Special in 2011, and collected in the second volume of the compilation Fairy Tail S released on September 16, 2016. The chapter was adapted into an original video animation of the same name, released on August 16, 2013, with voice actor Tomokazu Seki reprising his role from Japanese media. Haru also appears in Mashima Hero's, a manga series crossover with Fairy Tail and Edens Zero, released from October 16 to December 25, 2019.

Reception

Critical response to Haru's character has been mixed. Despite seeing Haru as common shonen manga protagonist, UK Anime Network said that there were major depths in his role in the story. He also felt that his character felt influenced by video game Final Fantasy VII protagonist Cloud Strife due to how both wield oversized swords, have colored spiky hairs among other elements. Anime News Network had mixed feelings about Haru's writing, finding it too simple but the fact that he was still searching for his missing father was the subject of positive response. Similarly, Chris Beveridge from Mania Entertainment enjoyed the expansion of Haru's family story in the manga as he and his father become allies once the antagonists are explored especially when facing King. THEM Anime Reviews was more critical, finding him too simple in regards to design as well as role in the story. Manga News also found Haru conventional but felt his execution to be properly made by the author. The reviewer also noted that Mashima seemed to have made the character to rival the ones from the manga series One Piece but does not live up to their quality.

The Haru from the anime adaptation received similar comments by Anime News Network but had mixed feelings about his dynamics with Elie about whether or not they are more appealing when interacting. DVDTalk criticized his usage of a sword when compared with the villains who use more conventional weaponry and was bothered by how the protagonist did not care about his enemies' sins. While still finding him as a conventional protagonist, Anime News Network still felt that Haru's values and relationships made him more interesting as the narrative progresses. Yuri Lowenthal's performance as Haru was also criticized for coming across as a cartoon character aimed at young children due to his yelling when fighting. Nevertheless, Lowenthal's performance attracted director Marc Handler, leading to his eventual inclusion in the anime Naruto as the role of Sasuke Uchiha. 

Erkael from Manga News seeing Haru fight alongside Shiki and Natsu in Mashima's Heros'' even if it was fanservice. Haru's and Elie's characters inspired two types perfume by Erie Eau de Parfum.

References

Comics characters introduced in 1999
Male characters in anime and manga
Male characters in television
Teenage characters in anime and manga
Teenage characters in television